Le Plaisir (English title, House of Pleasure) is a 1952 French comedy-drama anthology film by German-born film director Max Ophüls (1902–1957) adapting three short stories by Guy de Maupassant — "Le Masque" (1889), "La Maison Tellier" (1881), and "Le Modèle" (1883).

Le Plaisir was nominated for an Oscar for Best Art Direction, going to Ophüls. This was the last of Ophüls' two Oscar nominations in his career.

Plot

Le Masque
A masked young dandy goes to an ornate dance hall, where he finds a young woman to be his dance partner. When he faints from the exertion, a doctor is called. He discovers that the dandy's mask hides his aged appearance. The doctor takes the old man home to his patient wife. She explains that her husband Ambroise used to attract the ladies who frequented the hairdresser salon where he worked, but in the space of two years, he lost his looks. He goes out in disguise in an attempt to recapture his youth.

La Maison Tellier
Julia Tellier, the well-respected madam of a small-town brothel, takes her girls on an outing to her brother's village to attend the First Communion of her niece. Her regular patrons are taken aback when they discover the brothel closed without explanation that Saturday night. One finally discovers a sign explaining the reason and is relieved. At the village, everyone is very impressed by the group of elegant ladies who have appeared to support the girl at her First Communion. The prostitutes are moved to tears by the ceremony, as is the rest of the congregation. Julia's brother Joseph becomes infatuated with Rosa, one of her workers, and promises to visit next month.

Le Modèle
A painter falls in love with his model. Things are idyllic at first, but after living together for a while, they begin to quarrel constantly. Finally, he moves in with his friend. She eventually finds him, but he wants no more to do with her. He ignores her threat to jump from a window, and is so guilt-ridden when she does so immediately that he marries her.

Cast
Le Masque
Claude Dauphin as the doctor
Gaby Morlay as Denise, Ambroise's wife
Paul Azaïs as a dance hall patron
Gaby Bruyère as Frimousse, Ambroise's dance partner
Jean Galland as Ambroise

La Maison Tellier
Madeleine Renaud as Julia Tellier
Ginette Leclerc as Madame Flora, one of Julia's girls
Mila Parély as Madame Raphaële, another of Julia's employees
Danielle Darrieux as Madame Rosa, another worker
Pierre Brasseur as Julien Ledentu, a traveling salesman who becomes too fresh with the girls on the train trip
Jean Gabin as Joseph Rivet, Julia's brother
Amédée as Frédéric, another whorehouse employee
Antoine Balpêtré as Monsieur Poulain, a patron
René Blancard as the mayor
Mathilde Casadesus as Madame Louise, another worker
Henri Crémieux as Monsieur Pimpesse
Arthur Devère as the train conductor
Paulette Dubost as Madame Fernande, another employee
Jocelyne Jany as Constance Rivet, Julia's niece
Robert Lombard as Monsieur Philippe, the banker's son, a patron
Héléna Manson as Marie Rivet, Joseph's wife
Georges Baconnet as Un client de la maison Tellie

Le Modèle
Jean Servais as Jean's friend, also narrator of the French version
Daniel Gélin as Jean, the painter
Simone Simon as Joséphine, the model

References

External links

Le plaisir: Life Is Movement an essay by Robin Wood at the Criterion Collection
"Max Ophul's le Plaisir" at the MOMA website

1952 films
1950s romantic comedy-drama films
French anthology films
French black-and-white films
French romantic comedy-drama films
Films about fictional painters
Films about old age
Films about prostitution in France
Films based on works by Guy de Maupassant
Films directed by Max Ophüls
1950s French-language films
Films based on short fiction
Films based on multiple works
1952 comedy films
1952 drama films
Columbia Pictures films
1950s French films